"I Already Do" is a song co-written and recorded by American country music artist Chely Wright.  It was released in March 1998 as the third single from the album Let Me In.  The song reached #36 on the Billboard Hot Country Singles & Tracks chart.  The song was written by Wright and Gary Burr.

Chart performance

References

1998 singles
1997 songs
Chely Wright songs
Songs written by Gary Burr
Songs written by Chely Wright
Song recordings produced by Tony Brown (record producer)
MCA Nashville Records singles